Henry George Smith (26 July 1852 – 19 September 1924) was an Australian chemist whose pioneering work on the chemistry of the essential oils of the Australian flora achieved worldwide recognition.

Smith was born at Littlebourne, Kent, England. He was educated at schools at Ickham and Wingham, and also had private tuition from the Rev. Mr Midgley, M.A. He went to Sydney in 1883 for health reasons, and in 1884 obtained a semi-scientific position on the staff of the Sydney technological museum. He began studying scientific subjects and chemistry in particular, in 1891 was appointed a laboratory assistant at the museum, and in the same year his first original paper was published in the Proceedings of the Linnean Society of New South Wales. He became mineralogist at the museum in 1895, and in the same year in collaboration with Joseph Maiden contributed a paper on "Eucalyptus Kinos and the Occurrence of Endesmia" to the Proceedings of the Royal Society of New South Wales. This was Smith's first contribution to organic chemistry; later on from 1898 to 1911 he lectured on this subject to evening students at the Sydney technical college. 

In 1896 he began his collaboration with Richard Thomas Baker with an investigation into the essential oils of the Sydney peppermint (Eucalyptus piperita). With Baker working on the botanical side and himself on the chemical, their studies resulted in a remarkable work, A Research on the Eucalyptus especially in Regard to their Essential Oils which was published in 1902. A revised edition of this work embodying later researches appeared in 1920. Another authoritative work of great value by these authors, A Research on the Pines of Australia, was published in 1910. Smith had been appointed assistant curator and economic chemist at the Sydney technological museum in 1899 and held this position until his retirement in 1921. After his retirement he continued working with Baker and in 1924 they brought out another volume, Wood-fibres of Some Australian Timbers.  He died of heart disease at home in the Sydney suburb of Roseville 

From about 1914 Smith had been informally associated with the organic chemistry department of the University of Sydney, and he continued to work there after his retirement from the museum. In 1922 he was awarded the David Syme prize of the University of Melbourne for original research. He was president of the Royal Society of New South Wales in 1913, of the New South Wales branch of the Australian Chemical Institute in 1922-3, and of the chemistry section of the Australasian Association for the Advancement of Science at the meeting held in Wellington in 1923. He was the author of over 100 papers, 62 of which appeared in the Proceedings of the Royal Society of New South Wales, and others in the Journal of the Chemical Society.

Selected publications

References 

1852 births
1924 deaths
Australian chemists
Botanists active in Australia
People from Littlebourne